Windwhistle is a small farming settlement in the Selwyn District of New Zealand. It is located on State Highway 77 near the Rakaia Gorge. Windwhistle is 81 kilometers drive to the west of Christchurch and 22 kilometers north of Methven. Windwhistle's name comes from the way the wind sounds when the Canterbury north west wind blows.

Washpen Falls 

The Washpen Falls walk is located near Windwhistle on Washpen Road. It is a well maintained day walk to a waterfall on a private track. The walk goes through a canyon which was formed by an extinct volcano. The track is surrounded by native bush and many native birds can be seen and heard. Parts of the 2015 movie Z for Zachariah  were filmed at Washpen Falls.

Windwhistle School 

Windwhistle school is a primary school that was established in 1935. It has a heated swimming pool.

Windwhistle Winter Sports Club 
The Windwhistle Winter Sports Club (WWSC) was founded in 1932.  Ice-skating at Lake Ida was their first endeavor. In 1948 the club started to develop Mount Olympus as a ski field. The rope tow was installed in 1952. The ski field has developed since then with plenty of voluntary contributions to build the accommodation and ski lodge on the mountain. Other facilities include a hot tub and curling. Mount Olympus Ski Field was unable to open in 2020.

Terrace Downs 
Terrace Downs golf resort is located 6 kilometers away from Windwhistle. The resort has  an 18-hole golf course, restaurant, wedding and conference facilities and  52 apartments there are 26 free-standing chalet-style homes. The resort was for sale after the owner died of COVID-19 in April 2020.

See also
List of towns in New Zealand

References

Selwyn District
Populated places in Canterbury, New Zealand